Weekly Illustrated was a weekly British magazine.

The magazine was launched in 1934 by Odhams Press, publishers of the Daily Herald. Under the editorship of Stefan Lorant (1901–1997) it was the first British picture magazine that was based on European ideas of photo reportage. Photojournalists contributing to the magazine included Bill Brandt and Felix H. Man. There were sometimes special issues for notable occasions such as coronations and royal birthdays, or selected topics such as the Queen Mary liner. Journalists working with Stefan Lorant included Tom Hopkinson (1905–1990), later knighted in 1978. Both were also editors of the magazine Picture Post. In 1939 the Weekly Illustrated changed its name to Illustrated when it merged with Passing Show. It continued to be published until 1958 when it was incorporated into John Bull.

See also
 Picture Post

References

Year of establishment missing
Year of disestablishment missing
Defunct magazines published in the United Kingdom
Photojournalistic magazines
Weekly magazines published in the United Kingdom